Balm in Gilead is the eleventh studio album by American singer-songwriter Rickie Lee Jones, released on November 3, 2009 by Fantasy Records. It was produced by Rickie Lee Jones together with David Kalish and Sheldon Gomberg.

Track listing

Personnel
Rickie Lee Jones – vocals, guitars, bowed bass, banjo, keyboards, piano, electric piano, percussions, finger snaps; horn arrangements on "Wild Girl" and "Old Enough"
Sebastian Steinberg – bass
Tom Evans – saxophone, flute
Brian Swartz – trumpet
Arnold McCuller – background vocals
Jon Brion – baritone guitar, guitar, bass
David Kalish – bass, guitar, dobro, piano, organ
Pete Thomas – drums
Ben Harper – slide guitar
Joel Guzman – organ, accordion
Reggie McBride – bass
Charlie Paxson – drums
Patrick Maguire – octave guitar
Alison Krauss – violin
Vic Chesnutt – vocals
John Reynolds – guitar, whistle
Victoria Williams – vocals
Tony Scherr – bass
Kenny Wollesen – drums
Chris Joyner – electric piano, vocals
Bill Frisell – guitar
Paulie Cerra – saxophone
Grey DeLisle – autoharp
Danny Frankel – percussions, tambourine
Ed Maxwell – bass
John Doan – harp guitar
Craig Eastman – violin, mandolin
Blair Aaronson – string and horn arrangement on "Eucalyptus Trail"
Technical
Barrie Maguire, Chris Testa, David Kalish, Mark Johnson, Sheldon Gomberg – engineer
Larissa Collins – art direction

References

2009 albums
Rickie Lee Jones albums
Fantasy Records albums